Augustus Steele (June 4, 1792 – October 25, 1864) was a Florida entrepreneur,  a Florida state legislator, and considered the founder of Hillsborough County.

Career and life

Early life 
Augustus Steele was born June 4, 1792, somewhere in Connecticut.

Personal life 
Steele was married to Elizabeth Coddingham, about whom no information is known. He had one daughter, Augusta Florida Steele, who was born on Atsena Otie Key in 1847. Augusta received her education there by tutors including Lignoski and James Ryder Randall.

Time in Northern Florida 
Steele had come to Florida in 1825 and was originally a settler in Northern Florida. He later helped found the town of Magnolia. The town was soon eclipsed by St. Marks, and Steele decided to move south to Fort Brooke in Tampa.

Tampa 
Steele came to Tampa in 1830 and planned the city. Tampa at the time of Steele's arrival was only a small village. Steele suggested that there be a county there and said it should have Tampa as its county seat. Steele persuaded friends that he knew in the State Capitol, Tallahassee, and made the county 8,580 sq miles of land for Hillsborough County. During the Seminole War, Steele was given the position of postmaster at Fort Brooke. He was asked to give the news of the Dade Massacre from Fort Brooke to the governor. His town plat was invalidated by the state because it had included Fort Brooke's property.

Cedar Keys 
Steele, discouraged, left Tampa after the town plat was invalidated and moved to Cedar Key. After this, Steele bought land at a Navy land auction at Atsena Otie Key and with it built a resort there. Steele wanted Atsena Otie to be a port and planned on using its deep water facilities for shipping out cotton, lumber, sugar, and tobacco from plantations inland. Steele bought all the buildings on the island for $270 (worth $6,900 in 2015) in 1843. Steele later on became Cedar Key's postmaster, Tampa & Cedar Key's port inspector, and an Internal Revenue Service collector.

Politics 
Augustus ran for the Florida State Legislature in 1850 and 1852. This allowed him to lobby for a cross-state railroad. The railroad was one of the first in Florida and Steele desired its route to go to Cedar Key which was one of Florida's main ports. In 1852 he joined with David Yulee going against Governor Thomas Brown's idea of it going to St. Marks.

In 1860, local voters decided to send Augustus Steele as a representative of Levy County to the Florida Secession Committee which was trying to secede from the United States and become part of The Confederacy.

Death 
Steele died October 25, 1864 in Wellborn, Florida.

References

1792 births
1864 deaths
People from Connecticut
Members of the Florida House of Representatives
People from Hillsborough County, Florida
People from Levy County, Florida
People from Wakulla County, Florida
Florida pioneers
19th-century American politicians